Aspedamite is a very rare mineral, one of two natural heteropolyniobates. Its chemical formula (one of the possible formulas) is complex and shows the presence of essential vacancies: []12(Fe3+2Fe2+)Nb4(ThNb9Fe3+2Ti4+O42)(H2O)9(OH)3. Its structure (isometric, space group Im3) is the same as of the second known heteropolyniobate - menezesite. Aspedamite is somewhat similar to another mineral from Norway, peterandresenite, which is a hexaniobate.

References

Niobium minerals
Thorium minerals
Iron(II,III) minerals
Titanium minerals
Cubic minerals